Andriy Khripta (born 29 November 1986) is a Ukrainian former racing cyclist. He rode at the 2014 UCI Road World Championships.

Major results

2011
 8th Grand Prix of Donetsk
2012
 1st Stage 2 (TTT) Sibiu Cycling Tour
 6th Overall Grand Prix of Adygeya
2013
 1st Overall Grand Prix of Adygeya
 2nd Memorial Oleg Dyachenko
 7th Overall Tour of Romania
1st Prologue (TTT)
 8th Overall Five Rings of Moscow
2014
 7th Overall Tour of Iran
2015
 1st Grand Prix of ISD
 2nd Time trial, National Road Championships
 2nd Overall Five Rings of Moscow
 3rd Grand Prix of Vinnytsia
 6th Race Horizon Park for Peace
2016
 2nd Time trial, National Road Championships

References

External links

1986 births
Living people
Ukrainian male cyclists
People from Znamianka
Cyclists at the 2016 Summer Olympics
Olympic cyclists of Ukraine
Sportspeople from Kirovohrad Oblast
21st-century Ukrainian people